Nuclear command and control (NC2) is the command and control of nuclear weapons.  The U. S. military's Nuclear Matters Handbook 2015 defined it as the "activities, processes, and procedures performed by appropriate military commanders and support personnel that, through the chain of command, allow for senior-level decisions on nuclear weapons employment." The current Nuclear Matters Handbook 2020 [Revised] defines it as "the exercise of authority and direction, through established command lines, over nuclear weapon operations by the President as the chief executive and head of state."

United States

In the United States, leadership decisions are communicated to the nuclear forces via an intricate Nuclear Command and Control System (NCCS). The NCCS provides the President of the United States with the means to authorize the use of nuclear weapons in a crisis and to prevent unauthorized or accidental use. It is an essential element to ensure crisis stability, deter attack against the United States and its allies, and maintain the safety, security, and effectiveness of the U.S. nuclear deterrent. Nuclear Command and Control and Communications (NC3), is managed by the Military Departments, nuclear force commanders, and the defense agencies. NCCS facilities include the fixed National Military Command Center (NMCC), the Global Operation Center (GOC), the airborne E-4B National Airborne Operations Center (NAOC), and the E-6B Take Charge and Move Out (TACAMO)/Airborne Command Post (Looking Glass)

Formerly, decisions on the employment of nuclear weapons were made only by the National Command Authority (NCA), which consists of the President of the United States and the Secretary of Defense, acting in concert.  However, the current Nuclear Matters Handbook 2020 [Revised] states: "The President bases this decision [to employ nuclear weapons] on many factors and will consider the advice and recommendations of senior advisors, to include the Secretary of Defense, the CJCS, and CCDRs." Note that both the 2015 and the 2020 Handbooks describe themselves as "unofficial."

The Ground Based Strategic Deterrent (GBSD) is entering the design review phase, as of 22 September 2021.

Other countries
 Nuclear Command Authority (India), the authority responsible for command, control and operational decisions regarding India's nuclear weapons programme
 National Command Authority (Pakistan), the command that oversees the deployment, research and development, and operational command and control of Pakistan's nuclear arsenal
 :Category:United Kingdom nuclear command and control
Nuclear Command Corps

See also

Emergency Action Message
Launch control center (ICBM)

References